Zipperer is a German surname.  Notable people with the surname include:

 Ernst Zipperer (1888–1982), German graphic artist and painter

Falk Zipperer (1899–1966), German jurist, librarian and SS-Hauptsturmführer
Rich Zipperer (born 1974), American politician

German-language surnames
Surnames from given names